Jermy is a surname. Notable people with the surname include:
 (1932–2014), British botanist
Isaac Jermy, two Stanfield Hall murder victims by this name
Louise Jermy (1877–1952), British domestic servant and autobiographer
Robert Jermy, one of the owners of Bayfield Hall, a historical country house in Norfolk, England
Seth Jermy (1653–1724), Royal Navy officer

Several people also have a middle name Jermy:
Arthur Jermy Mounteney Jephson (1859–1908), English explorer
Richard John Philip Jermy Gwyn (1934–2020), Canadian writer

See also
Jermy baronets, a title in the Baronetage of England
Jeremy (given name)